The Geographical Journal is a quarterly peer-reviewed academic journal of the Royal Geographical Society (with the Institute of British Geographers). It publishes papers covering research on all aspects of geography. It also publishes shorter Commentary papers and Review Essays. Since 2001, The Geographical Journal has been published in collaboration with Wiley-Blackwell. The journal was established in 1831 as the Journal of the Royal Geographical Society of London. Prior to 2000, The Geographical Journal published society news alongside articles and it continues to publish the proceedings of the society's annual general meeting and presidential address in the September issue.

References

External links 
 
 Some issues fulltext via HathiTrust

Geography journals
Royal Geographical Society
Wiley-Blackwell academic journals
Publications established in 1831
English-language journals
Quarterly journals
Academic journals associated with learned and professional societies of the United Kingdom